is a 1966 science fiction horror film directed by Hajime Sato. An international co-production of Japan and the United States, it stars Sonny Chiba, Peggy Neal, Franz Gruber, Andrew Hughes, Tadashi Suganuma, and Hideo Murota.

Plot 

A group of surface-dwelling people stumbles upon an underwater city ruled by an amphibious mad scientist.

Cast 

 Sonny Chiba as Ken Abe
 Peggy Neal as Jenny Gleason
 Franz Gruber as Lieutenant Colonel Brown
 Andrew Hughes as Professor Howard
 Tadashi Suganuma as Nishida
 Hideo Murota as Navy Base Engineer A
 Osamu Yamanouchi as Navy Base Engineer B
 Ichiro Mizuki as Navy Base Engineer D
 Beverly Kahler as Luisa
 Mike Daneen as Dr. Josef Heim
 Enver Altenbay as Reporter A

Production

Release 
Terror Beneath the Sea was released in Japan on 1 July 1966. The film did not receive a theatrical release in the United States, instead being released directly to television by Teleworld.

Notes

References

External links 

 
 
 

1966 films
1960s monster movies
1960s science fiction horror films
1960s Japanese-language films
Japanese mystery films
1960s science fiction adventure films
Films scored by Shunsuke Kikuchi
Natural horror films
Underwater action films
Toei tokusatsu films
Japanese science fiction horror films
Toei Company films
Mad scientist films
American science fiction films
1960s fantasy adventure films
1966 horror films
Tokusatsu films
1960s American films
1960s Japanese films